The Colour of Murder is a 1957 crime novel by the British writer Julian Symons. It was awarded the Gold Dagger of the Crime Writers' Association for that year. It was republished by British Library Publishing in 2018 along with another Symons novel The Belting Inheritance.

Plot
Unhappily married John Wilkins meets Sheila, an attractive young librarian. He fantasises about killing his wife, so he can leave her and start a new life with Sheila.

References

Bibliography
 Walsdorf, John J. & Allen, Bonnie J. Julian Symons: A Bibliography. Oak Knoll Press, 1996.

1957 British novels
Novels by Julian Symons
British crime novels
British mystery novels
Collins Crime Club books
Novels set in England